Third sergeant is typically a non-commissioned officer rank, used in some countries.

Brazil 
Third sergeant is a rank in the armed forces of Brazil.

Singapore 
Third sergeant is a specialist rank in the Singapore Armed Forces. Third sergeants are the most junior of specialists (Non-commissioned officer). The 3SG rank insignia is three chevrons pointing down, common by all specialists, without any chevrons pointing up.

In combat units, third sergeants are usually section commanders working with the supervision of a commissioned officer holding the appointment of platoon commander, and under the supervision of a senior specialist holding the appointment of platoon sergeant. 

Third sergeants in the SAF also hold equivalent junior commander appointments, assisting a platoon section of enlistees. For example, transport supervisors, commonly known as the MT (motor transport) section commanders, and such as battalion company quartermaster sergeant. In other armies, this position is usually held by staff sergeants and above, while in Singapore, conscript soldiers holding these appointments are of the rank of third sergeant due to competency and manpower.

Gallery

See also 
 Sergeant
 First sergeant
 Second sergeant

References 

Military ranks of Singapore